Luis Alberto Closa (born 10 March 1984), commonly known as Luis Closa, is a Paraguayan professional footballer who currently plays for Bolivian club Club San José. He plays as a midfielder.

Career
Luis Closa has played for 10 professional clubs in his career, in countries like Paraguay, Colombia, Argentina, Perú and Singapore. He started off his career with 12 de Octubre, before moving out of Paraguay to Columbia to join Deportes Tolima.

Although he returned to Paraguayan side Club Rubio Ñu in 2011, he left for Argentina in 2012, before returning to his home country in 2013. He subsequently joined five-time S.League champions Tampines Rovers in 2014.

References

1984 births
Living people
Paraguayan footballers
Paraguayan expatriate footballers
Expatriate footballers in Singapore
Tampines Rovers FC players
Singapore Premier League players
Association football midfielders